The 1989 FIA European Formula Three Cup was the fifth European Formula Three Cup race and the first to be held at the Misano World Circuit on October 15, 1989. The race was won by Italian Gianni Morbidelli, driving for Forti Corse outfit, who finished ahead of fellow Italians Antonio Tamburini and Giovanni Bonanno.

Drivers and teams

Classification

Qualifying

Race

See also
FIA European Formula Three Cup

References

FIA European Formula Three Cup
FIA European Formula Three Cup